Winston Tong (born 1951 in San Francisco, California) is an actor, playwright, visual artist, puppeteer, and singer-songwriter.  He is best known for his vocals in Tuxedomoon and for winning an Obie award in puppetry for Bound Feet in 1978.

Early years
Tong was born in the United States to Chinese parents exiled by the Communist revolution. He graduated with a degree in theatre from the California Institute of Arts in 1973. While at CalArts, he studied classical vocals with Marni Nixon. In 1969, Tong was commissioned to illustrate The Dinosaur Coloring Book by Malcolm Whyte, which was first published by Troubador Press and later by Price Stern Sloan.

Performance art
After graduating from CalArts, Tong established his reputation in the Bay Area with a string of charismatic, left-field performance pieces such as Wild Boys, Eliminations, Frankie and Johnnie and the award-winning Bound Feet, which was loosely based on traditional Chinese puppet theatre. 

Tong performed three of his solo pieces at La MaMa Experimental Theatre Club in April/May 1978. The Wild Boys, identified on the show's program as a work in progress, incorporated work by William Burroughs, Brian Eno, George Olsen, Kawahara, Victoria Lowe, and Tuxedomoon. Bound Feet incorporated music by Erik Satie. À Rimbaud incorporated work by Arthur Rimbaud and Heitor Villa-Lobos. He returned to La MaMa with Tuxedomoon bandmate Bruce Geduldig in 1978 to perform two pieces, Nijinsky (Fragments) from the diary of Vaslav Nijinsky with music by Frederic Chopin and Bound Feet (Reformed).

Frankie and Johnnie appeared in the 1981 documentary film Theater in Trance by Rainer Werner Fassbinder, who shot the film at the Theaters of the World Festival in June 1981 in Cologne. Geduldig directed himself and Tong in a production of Frankie and Johnnie at La MaMa Experimental Theatre Club in 1982.

Musical career
Tong joined Tuxedomoon in 1977.  He sporadically recorded and performed live with the group, and also recorded solo material including the electropop dance album Theoretically Chinese in 1985, a 9-song album produced by Alan Rankine featuring guests such as Stephen Morris of New Order, Dave Formula, and Jah Wobble, as well as many other familiar musicians from Tong's past. The album and its subsequent singles, "Theoretical China" and "Reports From The Heart", were released on Les Disques du Crepuscule.

His composition "In a Manner of Speaking" from 1985's Holy Wars was later covered by Martin Gore, Nouvelle Vague, and Amanda Palmer, and remains his best known song. Tong left Tuxedomoon in 1985.

In March 2005, Tong reunited with Tuxedomoon for two performances in San Francisco, the first time they had performed together in over twenty years.

Tong's career, including his solo work, is detailed in Isabelle Corbisier's 2008 book on Tuxedomoon, Music for Vagabonds – the Tuxedomoon Chronicles.

Discography

With Tuxedomoon

 Joe Boy... The Electronic Ghost / Pinheads "O.T.M." (7-inch) 1978
 No Tears (12"-inch) 1978
 The Stranger / Love No Hope" (7-inch) 1979
 Desire 1981
 Joeboy in Rotterdam / Joeboy San Francisco 1981
 Divine 1982
 Ninotchka / Again (12-inch) 1982
 Suite en Sous-Sol (2x12-inch) 1982
 Time to Lose/Blind (12-inch) 1982
 A Thousand Lives By Picture 1983
 Soma (7-inch) 1984
 Holy Wars 1985

Solo

 Stranger (7-inch) 1979
 Like The Others (7-inch) 1983, Les Disques Du Crepuscule
 Theoretical China (12-inch with Niki Mono) 1984, Les Disques Du Crepuscule
 Reports From The Heart 1985, Les Disques Du Crepuscule
 Theoretically Chinese 1985, Les Disques Du Crepuscule
 Broken English (remix; 12-inch; released in Italy) 1986
 Like The Others 1990
 Miserere 2003, LTM Recordings
 The Unperceived Image (ltd. 7-inch with David J) 2007
 Theoretically Chinese (reissue on LTM Recordings) 2005

References

External links
 Winston Tong's website
 Winston Tong at Discogs.com
 Winston Tong biography at LTM Recordings
 Winston Tong MP3s downloads
 Tong's page on La MaMa Archives Digital Collections

1951 births
American puppeteers
American people of Chinese descent
Male actors from San Francisco
American new wave musicians
Living people
Alumni of Chelsea College of Arts